The 2013 Nova Scotia Scotties Tournament of Hearts, the women's provincial curling championship for Nova Scotia, was held from January 23 to 27 at the Halifax Curling Club in Halifax, Nova Scotia. The winning Mary-Anne Arsenault rink represented Nova Scotia at the 2013 Scotties Tournament of Hearts in Kingston, Ontario.

Teams

Round-robin standings
Final round-robin standings

Round-robin results
All draw times are listed in Atlantic Standard Time (UTC-4).

Draw 1
Wednesday, January 23, 1:00 pm

Draw 2
Wednesday, January 23, 7:00 pm

Draw 3
Thursday, January 24, 1:00 pm

Draw 4
Thursday, January 24, 7:00 pm

Draw 5
Friday, January 25, 1:00 pm

Draw 6
Friday, January 25, 7:00 pm

Draw 7
Saturday, January 26, 9:00 am

Playoffs

Semifinal
Saturday, January 26, 7:00 pm

Final
Sunday, January 27, 2:00 pm

Qualification rounds

Round 1
The first qualification round for the 2013 Nova Scotties Tournament of Hearts took place from December 13 to 16, 2012 at the Sydney Curling Club in Sydney. The format of play was an open-entry triple knockout qualifying six teams to the provincial playoffs.

Teams
The teams are listed as follows:

Results

A Event

B Event

C Event

Round 2
The second qualification round for the 2013 Nova Scotties Tournament of Hearts took place from January 4 to 6 at the Strait Area Community Curling Club in Port Hawkesbury. The format of play was an open-entry double knockout qualifying two teams to the provincial playoffs.

Teams

Results

A Event

B Event

References

Nova Scotia
Curling competitions in Halifax, Nova Scotia
2013 in Nova Scotia
January 2013 sports events in Canada